Alan Lewis may refer to:

 Alan Lewis (footballer) (1954–2016), English footballer
 Alan Lewis (rugby union and cricket) (born 1964), Irish cricketer and rugby union referee
 Alan Lewis (sport shooter) (born 1950), Irish sport shooter
 Alan Lewis (music journalist) (1945–2021), British music journalist and editor

See also
 Brad Alan Lewis (born 1954), American rower
 Alun Lewis (disambiguation)
 Al Lewis (disambiguation)
 Allan Lewis (disambiguation)
 Allen Lewis (disambiguation)